The 1348 Battle of Shijōnawate was a battle of the Nanboku-chō period of Japanese history, and took place in Yoshino, Nara. It was fought between the armies of the Northern and Southern Court of Japan.

Overview 
On February 4, 1348, the war began between Kusunoki Masatsura of the Southern Court and Kō no Moronao of the Northern Court. The Southern army was attacked at Yoshino, the temporary palace of the Imperial residence. Feeling too weak to defend the residence, Masatsura marched out with his whole force to meet his assailants. Kitabatake Chikafusa, meanwhile, led his force towards Izumi, diverting some of the attackers away from the palace.

Kusunoki engaged the enemy commander Kō no Moroyasu in single combat, and, it is said, was about to take Kō's head when he was struck by an arrow; Kusunoki then committed seppuku.

The battle ended in a Northern Court victory, but the Southern Court fled Yoshino, leaving little for their enemies to capture. Masatsura, along with his younger brother and second in charge, Masatoki, died during the war.

References

Further reading
George Bruce. Harbottle's Dictionary of Battles. (Van Nostrand Reinhold, 1981).

1340s in Japan
1348 in Asia
Shijo Nawate
Conflicts in 1348